Samuel Nicholas Bracey (born 19 May 1994) is an English former first-class cricketer.

Bracey was born at Bristol in May 1994. He was educated at Winterbourne Academy, before going up to Cardiff Metropolitan University. While studying at Cardiff, he made three appearances in first-class cricket for Cardiff MCCU, making two appearances in 2014 and one in 2015. Playing as a wicket-keeper, he scored 22 runs and took 4 catches behind the stumps. His brother, James, plays county cricket for Gloucestershire.

References

External links

1994 births
Living people
Cricketers from Bristol
Alumni of Cardiff Metropolitan University
English cricketers
Cardiff MCCU cricketers